The locomotives of ČSD's Class E 426.0 (ČD's Class 113) are essentially ČSD Class E 458.0 locomotives redesigned to work from the 1500 V DC overhead wire electrification system. They are retained for use on line 202 from Tábor to Bechyně.

When delivered, the class E 426.0 locomotives ran at half the power of an E 458.0, reflecting the lower line voltage. During 1992, 113 002-0 was modified to allow parallel connection of the traction motors. This allowed operation at the full power rating (800 kW).  Locomotives 113 001-2 and 113 003-8 were similarly modified.  The remaining locomotive (113 004-6) has not been modified.

The two remaining locomotives (113 005-3 and 113 006-1) are now used as 3000 V DC system locomotives. During 2004, they were renumbered as 110 205-2 and 110 206-0 respectively.

See also
List of České dráhy locomotive classes

References

External links 

 Czech and Slovak Railway Group in English

Škoda locomotives
Bo′Bo′ locomotives
1500 V DC locomotives
Electric locomotives of Czechoslovakia
Electric locomotives of the Czech Republic
Railway locomotives introduced in 1973
Standard gauge locomotives of Czechoslovakia
Standard gauge locomotives of the Czech Republic

Bo′Bo′ electric locomotives of Europe